Agalaioi is a village of the Grevena municipality. Before the 2011 local government reform it was a part of the municipality of Ventzio. The 2011 census recorded 47 residents in the village. Agalaioi is a part of the community of Kentro.

See also
 List of settlements in the Grevena regional unit

References

Populated places in Grevena (regional unit)